Keanu Reeves is a Canadian actor who has appeared in films, television series and video games. He made his film debut in the short One Step Away in 1985. The following year, Reeves appeared in the crime film River's Edge, and the television films Babes in Toyland, Act of Vengeance, and Brotherhood of Justice. His first lead role was as a teenager dealing with his best friend's suicide in the 1988 drama Permanent Record. His breakthrough role came when he played time-travelling slacker Ted "Theodore" Logan in the science fiction comedy Bill & Ted's Excellent Adventure (1989) with Alex Winter, which was an unexpected commercial success. Reeves followed this with a supporting role in Ron Howard's comedy Parenthood. In 1991 he starred in the action film Point Break with Patrick Swayze, the science fiction comedy sequel Bill & Ted's Bogus Journey, and the independent drama My Own Private Idaho.

He starred as a police officer in the action thriller Speed (1994) with Sandra Bullock, which was a commercial and critical success. However he followed this with a series of films that performed poorly at the box office, including Johnny Mnemonic (1995) and Chain Reaction (1996). His career experienced a turnaround when he played computer hacker Neo in the science fiction film The Matrix (1999). The film was a commercial success and received critical acclaim. He reprised the role in its sequels, The Matrix Reloaded, The Matrix Revolutions (both 2003), and The Matrix Resurrections (2021). Reeves played exorcist John Constantine in Constantine and a dentist in the comedy-drama Thumbsucker (both 2005). He reunited with Bullock in the 2006 romantic drama The Lake House. In 2008, Reeves played alien Klaatu in The Day the Earth Stood Still.

Reeves played the titular assassin in the neo-noir action thriller John Wick (2014), which was a commercial success and had a generally positive reception from critics. He starred in its sequels, John Wick: Chapter 2 (2017) and John Wick: Chapter 3 – Parabellum (2019). In 2016, he played the ghost of a stuntman in the American-Swedish television series Swedish Dicks. Reeves voiced Duke Caboom in the animated film sequel Toy Story 4 (2019), which grossed over $1 billion at the worldwide box office.

Film

Television

Video games

References

External links 
 

Canadian filmographies
Male actor filmographies